Kuran (also Romanized as Kūrān) is a village in Fin Rural District, Fin District, Bandar Abbas County, Hormozgan Province, Iran.

Demographics

At the 2006 census, its population was 293, in 65 families.

References 

Populated places in Bandar Abbas County